Pierre Eugène Marcellin Berthelot  (25 October 1827 – 18 March 1907) was a French chemist and Republican politician noted for the ThomsenBerthelot principle of thermochemistry. He synthesized many organic compounds from inorganic substances, providing a large amount of counter-evidence to the theory of Jöns Jakob Berzelius that organic compounds required organisms in their synthesis.
Berthelot was convinced that chemical synthesis would revolutionize the food industry by the year 2000, and that synthesized foods would replace farms and pastures. "Why not", he asked, "if it proved cheaper and better to make the same materials than to grow them?"

He was considered "one of the most famous chemists in the world." Upon being appointed to the post of Minister of Foreign Affairs for the French government in 1895, he was considered "the most eminent living chemist" in France. 
In 1901, he was elected as one of the "Forty Immortals" of the Académie française.
He gave all his discoveries not only to the French government but to humanity.

Personal life
Berthelot was born in Rue du Mouton, Paris, France, on 25 October 1827, the son of a doctor. He decided with his friend, the great historian Ernest Renan, not to attend a  where the vast majority of intellectuals were being educated.  After doing well at school in history and philosophy, he became a scientist.

He was an atheist but was very influenced by his wife, who was a Calvinist (his wife came from Louis Breguet's family).

Discoveries

The fundamental conception that underlay all Berthelot's chemical work was that all chemical phenomena depend on the action of physical forces which can be determined and measured. When he began his active career it was generally believed that, although some instances of the synthetic production of organic substances had been observed, on the whole organic chemistry remained an analytical science and could not become a constructive one, because the formation of the substances with which it deals required the intervention of vital activity in some shape. He engaged in a long argument with Louis Pasteur on the subject of vitalism, in which Pasteur took the vitalist position on the basis of his work on alcoholic fermentation.

To this attitude he offered uncompromising opposition, and by the synthetic production of numerous hydrocarbons, natural fats, sugars and other bodies he proved that organic compounds can be formed by ordinary methods of chemical manipulation and obey the same principles as inorganic substances, thus exhibiting the "creative character in virtue of which chemistry actually realizes the abstract conceptions of its theories and classifications—a prerogative so far possessed neither by the natural nor by the historical sciences."

Recognition
In 1863 he became a member of the Académie Nationale de Médecine; he was also awarded the Grand Cross of the Legion of Honour. He was elected a Foreign Honorary Member of the American Academy of Arts and Sciences in 1880. In 1881 he became a foreign member of the Royal Netherlands Academy of Arts and Sciences.

Avenue Berthelot in Lyon was named - obviously - after him on 25 March 1907.

Publications

His investigations on the synthesis of organic compounds were published in numerous papers and books, including Chimie organique fondée sur la synthèse (1860) and Les Carbures d'hydrogène (1901). He stated that chemical phenomena are not governed by any peculiar laws special to themselves, but are explicable in terms of the general laws of mechanics that are in operation throughout the universe; and this view he developed, with the aid of thousands of experiments, in his Mécanique chimique (1878) and his Thermochimie (1897). This branch of study naturally conducted him to the investigation of explosives, and on the theoretical side led to the results published in his work Sur la force de la poudre et des matières explosives (1872), while in practical terms it enabled him to render important services to his country as president of the scientific defence committee during the siege of Paris (1870–1871) and subsequently as chief of the French explosives committee. He performed experiments to determine gas pressures during hydrogen explosions using a special chamber fitted with a piston, and was able to distinguish burning of mixtures of hydrogen and oxygen from true explosions.

Historical and philosophical work
During later life he researched and wrote books on the early history of chemistry such as Les Origines de l'alchimie (1885) and Introduction à l'étude de la chimie des anciens et du moyen âge (1889), He also translated various old Greek, Syriac and Arabic treatises on alchemy and chemistry: Collection des anciens alchimistes grecs (1887–1888) and La Chimie au moyen âge (1893). He was the author of Science et philosophie (1886), which contains a well-known letter to Renan on "La Science idéale et la science positive," of La Révolution chimique, Lavoisier (1890), of Science et morale (1897), and of numerous articles in La Grande Encyclopédie, which he helped to establish.

 Untersuchungen über die Affinitäten, über Bildung und Zersetzung der Äther. Ostwalds Klassiker der exakten Wissenschaften; 173 Leipzig: Engelmann, 1910 Digital edition by the University and State Library Düsseldorf

Editions

Family

Berthelot died suddenly on 18 March 1907, immediately after the death of his wife Sophie Niaudet (1837–1907), in Paris. His professorship was filled by Emil Jungfleisch.

He was buried with his wife in the Panthéon. He had six children: Marcel André (1862–1939), Marie-Hélène (1863–1895), Camille (1864–1928), Daniel (1865–1927), Philippe (1866–1934), and René (1872–1960).

In art
Auguste Rodin created a bust of Berthelot.

See also
Abiogenic petroleum origin
Berthelot's reagent

Notes

References

Further reading

 Jean Jacques, Berthelot 1827-1907, autopsie d'un mythe, Paris, Belin, 1987. (The author, who admits not liking Berthelot, seeks to sort out the chaff and good grain, not only in his political and ideological activity, but also in his scientific work.)

External links

Berthelot at www.hh.schule.de
Berthelot, Marcelin (1827–1907), chimiste et homme politique français at isimabomba.free.fr
"Pierre-Eugène-Marcelin Berthelot" at encarta.msn.com (Archived 2009-11-01)
AllRefer.com – Pierre EugEne Marcelin Berthelot (Chemistry, Biography) – Encyclopedia at reference.allrefer.com
 
 
Biographies of Scientific Men/Berthelot - Wikisource, the free online library
 

1827 births
1907 deaths
Politicians from Paris
Members of the Académie Française
Academic staff of the Collège de France
French atheists
19th-century French chemists
French life senators
Grand Croix of the Légion d'honneur
Burials at the Panthéon, Paris
Recipients of the Copley Medal
Members of the Royal Swedish Academy of Sciences
Officers of the French Academy of Sciences
Fellows of the American Academy of Arts and Sciences
Corresponding members of the Saint Petersburg Academy of Sciences
Members of the Royal Netherlands Academy of Arts and Sciences
Foreign Members of the Royal Society
Foreign associates of the National Academy of Sciences
Recipients of the Pour le Mérite (civil class)
Scientists from Paris